The 1967 Michigan Wolverines football team was an American football team that represented the University of Michigan in the 1967 Big Ten Conference football season.  In its ninth year under head coach Bump Elliott, Michigan compiled a 4–6 record (3–4 against conference opponents), tied for fifth place in the Big Ten, and were outscored by a total of 179 to 144.

After opening the season with a victory over Duke, the team lost its next five games, including a 34–0 to rival Michigan State. After Dennis Brown took over from Dick Vidmer as the starting quarterback, the Wolverines won three consecutive games, coming from behind in each game. The team concluded its season with a 24–14 loss to Woody Hayes' Ohio State Buckeyes. 

Right halfback Ron Johnson broke Michigan's single-game and season rushing records (270 yards vs. Navy, 1,005 yards for the season) and received the team's most valuable player award. Michigan's other statistical leaders included Dennis Brown with 928 passing yards and end Jim Berline with 624 receiving yards. Three Michigan players received first-team honors on the 1967 All-Big Ten Conference football team: Ron Johnson, center Joe Dayton, and linebacker Tom Stincic.

Schedule

Personnel

Letter winners
The following players received varsity letters for their participation on the 1967 football team. Players starting at least five games are displayed in bold.

Offense
 Bob Baumgartner, 6'0", 219 pounds, junior, Chicago, Illinois - started 6 games at right guard
 Jim Berline, 6'0", 185 pounds, junior, Niles, Ohio - started 7 games at right end
 Stanley Broadnax, 6'0", 226 pounds, senior, Cincinnati, Ohio - offensive tackle
 Dennis Brown, 5'10", 175 pounds, junior, Lincoln Park, Michigan - started 6 games at quarterback
 Garvie Craw, 6'2", 211 pounds, sophomore, Montclair, New Jersey - started 3 games at fullback
 Joe Dayton, 6'2", 225 pounds, senior, Detroit, Michigan - started 8 games at center
 Peter Drehmann, 6'1", 206 pounds, sophomore, Abington, Pennsylvania - offensive tackle
 John Gabler, 6'2", 208 pounds, sophomore, Royal Oak, Michigan - started 5 games at left halfback
 Paul Johnson, 6'0", 231 pounds, senior, Bay City, Michigan - offensive tackle
 Ron Johnson, 6'1", 196 pounds, junior, Detroit, Michigan - started 7 games at right halfback
 Peter Mair, 6'4", 228 pounds, senior, Allentown, Pennsylvania - started 6 games at right tackle, 1 game at left tackle
 Jim Mandich, 6'3", 215 pounds, sophomore, Solon, Ohio - started 6 games at left end
 Gerald Miklos, 6'3", 227 pounds, junior, Chicago, Illinois - started 1 game at offensive left tackle
 Bob Penska, 6'1", 225 pounds, junior, Niles, Ohio - started 5 games at left tackle, 1 game at right tackle
 Ray Phillips, 6'3", 229 pounds, senior, Evanston, Illinois - started 7 games at left guard
 Ernest Sharpe, 5'11", 191 pounds, senior, Palos Heights, Illinois - started 2 games at left halfback
 Warren Sipp, 6'1", 209 pounds, junior, Akron, Ohio - started 3 games at fullback
 Royce Spencer, 6'1", 208 pounds, senior, Chicago, Illinois - end
 Frank Titas, 6'2", 205 pounds, sophomore, Cleveland, Ohio - started 4 games at fullback
 Dick Vidmer, 6'1", 183 pounds, senior, Greensburg, Pennsylvania - started 4 games at quarterback
 Thomas Weinman, 6'2", 214 pounds, sophomore, Ann Arbor, Michigan - started 1 game at left end, 1 game at right end, 1 game at left tackle
 Richard Yanz, 6'1", 217 pounds, junior, Chicago, Illinois - started 2 games at right guard

Defense
 Tom Curtis, 6'1", 184 pounds, Aurora, Ohio - started 8 games at safety, 1 game at cornerback
 Alfred Doty, 5'10", 187 pounds, senior, Mount Morris, Michigan - started 1 game at safety
 Tom Goss, 6'2", 225 pounds, senior, Knoxville, Tennessee - started 6 games at left defensive tackle, 1 game as offensive guard, 1 game as offensive tackle
 Mike Hankwitz, 6'1", 194 pounds, sophomore, Scottville, Michigan - linebacker
 Jerry Hartman, 6'1", 170 pounds, junior, Ann Arbor, Michigan - started 10 games at safety, 2 games at right halfback
 Brian Healy, 6'1", 170 pounds, sophomore, Sandusky, Ohio - started 8 games at cornerback, 1 game at left halfback
 Jon Heffelfinger, 6'2", 205 pounds, senior, Battle Creek, Michigan - started 2 games at left defensive end
 George Hoey, 5'10", 169 pounds, junior, Flint, Michigan - started 8 games at cornerback, 2 games at left halfback
 Jon Kramer, 6'3", 215 pounds, junior, Toledo, Ohio - started 7 games at right defensive end, 1 game at offensive end
 Dennis Monthei, 6'2", 201 pounds, senior, Detroit, Michigan - started 5 games at middle guard, 1 game at linebacker, 2 games at offensive guard
 Dennis Morgan, 5'11", 215 pounds, senior, Phoenixville, Pennsylvania - started 5 games at middle guard, 6 games at linebacker, 1 game at offensive tackle, 1 game at center, 1 game at halfback
 Douglas Nelson, 6'1", 181 pounds, senior, Adrian, Michigan - started 3 games at cornerback
 Barry Pierson, 6'0", 173 pounds, sophomore, St. Ignace, Michigan - started 1 game at safety
 Dave Porter, 6'3", 231 pounds, senior, Lansing, Michigan - started 10 games at defensive right tackle, 3 games at offensive tackle
 Rocky Rosema, 6'2", 225 pounds, senior, Grand Rapids, Michigan - started 5 games at linebacker, 4 games at left defensive end, 2 games at offensive end, 1 game at offensive guard
 Phil Seymour, 6'4", 195 pounds, sophomore, Berkley, Michigan - started 4 games at left defensive end, 1 game at right defensive end, 1 game at offensive end
 Tom Stincic, 6'3", 217 pounds, junior, Cleveland, Ohio - started 4 games at linebacker, 2 games at right defensive end, 1 game at offensive end, 1 game at offensive guard
 Robert Wedge, 6'2", 201 pounds, junior, Port Huron, Michigan - started 2 games at linebacker, 1 game at center
 James Wilhite - 6'3", 204 pounds, junior, Bay City, Michigan - middle guard
 Richard Williamson, 6'4", 227 pounds, senior, East Detroit, Michigan - started 4 games at left defensive tackle

Non-letter winners
 Cecil Pryor - started 2 games at linebacker

Coaching staff
Michigan's 1967 coaching, training, and support staff included the following persons.
Head coach: Bump Elliott
Assistant coaches: 
 Henry Fonde - offensive backfield coach
 George Mans - offensive ends coach
 Tony Mason - offensive line coach
 Don James - defensive backfield coach
 Y C McNease - defensive ends and linebackers coach
 Dennis Fitzgerald - defensive line coach
 Bill Dodd - freshmen football coach
Trainer: Jim Hunt
Manager: Stephen Kenney

Season summary

Preseason
The 1966 Michigan Wolverines football team compiled a 6–4 record and outscored opponents by a combined total of 236 to 138. In all, 22 of the letter winners from the 1966, including 14 starters, team lost to graduation or professional football. The most valuable player on the 1966 team was All-American end Jack Clancy who set Big Ten records for receptions and receiving yardage. Clancy was claimed by the Miami Dolphins in the 1967 NFL Draft. Other notable departures included: Jim Detwiler, the leading scorer in the Big Ten in 1966, who was taken in the first round of the draft; defensive back Rich Volk who was taken in the second round of the draft; linebacker Frank Nunley and defensive back John Rowser, both claimed in the third round; and running back Carl Ward, claimed in the fourth round.

Key players returning from the 1966 team included quarterback Dick Vidmer, center Joe Dayton, linebackers Rocky Rosema and Tom Stincic, defensive tackle Dave Porter, and defensive back George Hoey.

Michigan's 1967 recruiting class included Dan Dierdorf, Marty Huff, Don Moorhead, and Pete Newell.

Joe Dayton was selected as the team captain.

Look in its 1967 "College Football Forecast" picked Michigan to finish 19th in the country.

Duke

On September 23, 1967, Michigan defeated Duke, 10-7, before a crowd of 79,492 at Michigan Stadium. Duke scored a touchdown in the first quarter and held a 7-0 lead at halftime. In the third quarter, Tom Stincic recovered a fumble near midfield, and Michigan drove downfield with Ernest Sharpe running for a touchdown to tie the score. With 44 seconds remaining in the game, Michigan took the ball at Duke's 49-yard line. Quarterback Dick Vidmer completed two passes to move the ball to the 10-yard line, and sophomore fullback Frank Titas kicked a game-winning 20-yard field goal with 11 seconds remaining. Titas had earlier missed a 30-yard attempt in the third quarter. Ron Johnson gained 82 yards on 19 carries, and Sharpe added 65 yards on 19 carries. Vidmer completed 13 of 27 passes for 174 yards and two interceptions.

California

On September 30, 1967, Michigan lost to California, 10–9, before a crowd of 41,034 at California Memorial Stadium in Berkeley, California. It was Cal's first victory in five tries against Michigan and its first victory over a Big Ten team since 1952.

Cal took the lead with a 44-yard field goal midway through the first quarter. In the second quarter, Michigan took possession at Cal's 33-yard line after a 16-yard punt by Cal's Gary Fowler.  Michigan advanced to the one-yard line on two runs by Warren Sipp, and Ron Johnson then scored from the one-yard line. Brian Healy's extra point kick was wide left, and Michigan led, 6-3.

In the fourth quarter, Michigan linebacker Bob Wedge recovered a fumble at Cal's 19-yard line, and Mike Hankwitz kicked a 30-yard field goal to extend the lead to 9-3 with 6:14 remaining in the game. Cal then scored on a 77-yard bomb from reserve quarterback Randy Humphries to fullback John McGaffie with two minutes remaining and kicked the extra point to take a 10-9 lead. On the next play from scrimmage, Michigan quarterback Dick Vidmer threw a 73-yard touchdown pass to Jim Berline, but the play was negated on a penalty for backfield in motion. With the crowd noise following Cal's touchdown, halfback Ernest Sharpe had difficulty hearing the signals and went in motion early. After the penalty, Vidmer was intercepted. At the end of the game, Cal players carried their head coach Ray Willsey off the field.

Cal out-gained Michigan by a total of 281 yards to 175. Michigan's kickers cost the team seven points, as Brian Healy's extra point kick went wide left in the second quarter, and the Wolverines also missed on field goal attempts of 34 yards (by Frank Titas, wide left in the second quarter) and 26 yards (by Mike Hankwitz). Michigan quarterback Dick Vidmer completed 10 of 19 passes for 70 yards.

Navy

On October 7, 1967, Michigan lost to Navy, 26–21, before a crowd of 72,361 at Michigan Stadium. Michigan halfback Ron Johnson rushed for 270 yards, including touchdown runs of 62 and 72 yards. Johnson's effort broke the Michigan single-game rushing record of 216 yards set in 1943 by Bill Daley.

Michigan State

On October 14, 1967, Michigan lost to rival Michigan State by a 34–0 before a crowd of 103,210 at Michigan Stadium in Ann Arbor. It was Michigan State's largest margin of victory ever against Michigan. Michigan State quarterback Jimmy Raye scored three rushing touchdowns and passed for the other two. Three of the Spartans' touchdowns came in the last two-and-a-half minutes of the first half. For the Wolverines, Ron Johnson rushed for 107 yards on 24 carries.

Indiana

On October 21, 1967, Michigan lost to Indiana, 27–20, before a homecoming crowd of only 65,759 at Michigan Stadium in Ann Arbor.  Led by quarterback Harry Gonso, halfback John Isenbarger, and flanker Jade Butcher, Indiana jumped to a 20–0 lead in the second quarter.  Michigan followed with three unanswered touchdowns to tie the score at 20–20 in the fourth quarter.  Late in the fourth quarter, Indiana drove 85 yards, capped by a one-yard touchdown run by Isenbarger with 1:10 left in the game.

Isenbarger was the Hoosiers' biggest gainer with 101 rushing yards on 18 carries and 79 passing yards. In his first college start, Michigan quarterback Dennis Brown led the Wolverines to their best offensive game of the year with 399 yards of total offense. Brown rushed for 127 yards and two touchdowns and completed 18 of 31 passes for 211 yards and one interception. Halfback John Gabler, also in his first start, caught 10 passes for 101 yards. Mike Hankwitz missed an extra point kick and a field goal attempt from the 12-yard line.

Minnesota

On October 28, 1967, Michigan lost to Minnesota, 20–15, before a crowd of 50,006 at Memorial Stadium in Minneapolis. Michigan took a 20-0 lead on two touchdown runs from Ron Johnson (including a 59-yarder) and a Mike Hankwitz field goal.  Minnesota came back to win with two fourth-quarter touchdowns. Michigan quarterback Dennis Brown rushed for 65 yards and completed 9 of 21 passes for 94 yards and an interception. Ron Johnson rushed for 94 yards, and defensive back Tom Curtis intercepted two passes. The loss was the fifth in a row for the Wolverines.

Northwestern

On November 4, 1967, Michigan ended its five-game losing streak with a 7-3 victory over Northwestern, before a crowd of 62,063 at a snowy Michigan Stadium. The victory was the 500th in program history. Ron Johnson set a Big Ten record with 42 carries, totaling 167 rushing yards. Quarterback Dennis Brown scored the game's only touchdown on a one-yard run in the second quarter. Brown completed 10 of 22 passes for 77 yards and no interceptions.

Illinois

On November 11, 1967, Michigan defeated Illinois, 21–14, before a crowd of 44,237 at Memorial Stadium in Champaign, Illinois. Illinois led, 14-0, at halftime after Rich Johnson ran for two touchdowns. Michigan scored three touchdowns in the second half, including a 60-yard punt return by George Hoey. Dennis Brown completed 10 of 23 passes for 87 yards, a touchdown, and two interceptions. Ron Johnson rushed for 61 yards and a touchdown on 23 carries.

Wisconsin

On November 18, 1967, Michigan won its third consecutive game, defeating Wisconsin, 27–14, before a crowd of 44,721 at Camp Randall Stadium in Madison, Wisconsin. Quarterback Dennis Brown completed 12 of 17 passes for 232 yards and two touchdowns, including a 60-yard touchdown connection with Jim Berline. Brown also scored on a 44-yard touchdown run. Right halfback Ron Johnson gained 33 rushing yards, enabling him to break Tom Harmon's Michigan record of 884 yards in 1939.

Ohio State

On November 25, 1967, Michigan lost to Ohio State, 24–14, before a crowd of 64,144 at Michigan Stadium. Ohio State jumped to a 21–0 lead in the second quarter before Michigan attempted a comeback with a six-yard touchdown pass from Dennis Brown to Jim Berline and a 13-yard touchdown pass from Brown to John Gabler. Ohio State then put the game away, kicking a field goal with 1:59 remaining in the game. 

Ron Johnson gained 96 rushing yards to extend his single-season Michigan rushing record to 1,005 yards. Jim Berline caught eight passes for 89 yards. For Ohio State, Jim Otis gained 114 yards, and Rudy Hubbard added 104 yards. Michigan's athletic director Fritz Crisler and university president Harlan Hatcher, both of whom had announced their retirements, were honored by the Michigan Marching Band in a halftime ceremony.

Award season
No Michigan players received first-team honors on the 1967 All-America team. However, three players received second- or third-team honors as follows: running back Ron Johnson (CP-2); offensive guard Ray Phillips (CP-3, UPI-2); and center Joe Dayton (CP-3).

Seven Michigan players received recognition from the Associated Press (AP) or United Press International (UPI) on the 1967 All-Big Ten Conference football team as follows: center Joe Dayton (AP-1, UPI-1); running back Ron Johnson (AP-1, UPI-1); linebacker Tom Stincic (UPI-1); linebacker Dennis Morgan (AP-2, UPI-2); offensive end Jim Berline (AP-2); cornerback George Hoey (AP-2); and offensive guard Ray Phillips (UPI-2).

Team awards were presented as follows:
Most Valuable Player: Ron Johnson
Meyer Morton Award: Dick Yanz
John Maulbetsch Award: Jim Mandich
Arthur Robinson Scholarship Award: Dick Vidmer

Statistical leaders
Michigan's individual statistical leaders for the 1967 season include those listed below.

Rushing

Passing

Receiving

Kickoff returns

Punt returns

References

Michigan
Michigan Wolverines football seasons
Michigan Wolverines football